Charles Louis Fleischmann (November 3, 1835 – December 10, 1897) was a Hungarian-American manufacturer of yeast who founded Fleischmann Yeast Company.

In the late 1860s, he and his brother Maximilian created America’s first commercially produced yeast, which revolutionized baking in a way that made today's mass production and consumption of bread possible.

Life and work
A native of Jägerndorf, Moravian Silesia, Charles Fleischmann was the son of Alois (or Abraham) Fleischmann, a Jewish distiller and yeast maker, and Babette. He was educated in Budapest, Hungary, Vienna, and Prague. He was Hungarian and married the Russian Henriette Robertson in New York. He then managed a distillery in Vienna, where he produced spirits and yeast. In 1865, Fleischmann came to the United States, and was disappointed in the quality of locally baked bread in the Cincinnati, Ohio, region. The brothers, along with another business partner named James Gaff, founded what became the Fleischmann Yeast Company in Riverside, Cincinnati, in 1868.

In 1876, they exhibited a Model Vienna Bakery at the Centennial Exposition in Philadelphia, which brought international publicity and sales exposure to the fledgling company, and yeast sales dramatically increased. Eventually, Fleischmann would own 14 manufacturing facilities. Charles' son Max commuted to New York headquarters from his home in Santa Barbara, California, by private railcar.

The company still exists today as a St. Louis-based producer of yeast and other products. The Fleischmann Yeast Company eventually became the world's leading yeast producer and the second largest in the production of vinegar. It was also a commercial producer of gin, under the Fleischmann brand name. When Prohibition interfered with liquor sales, the Fleischmanns developed a new market for yeast, investigating its possible health benefits for skin and digestion, and promoting it as a good source of vitamins. They hired the J. Walter Thompson Company, who created a health food fad for yeast cakes.

Charles Fleischmann is responsible for numerous mechanical patents involving yeast production machinery. He helped to organize the Market National Bank and became its president from 1887 until his death in 1897. He was buried in Spring Grove Cemetery in a mausoleum based on the Parthenon. His son, Julius Fleischmann, later served as the mayor of Cincinnati.

Legacy
Charles Fleischmann was inducted into the American Society of Baking’s Baking Hall of Fame on March 3, 2008, at the society's annual meeting in Chicago, Illinois.

Fleischmann's son, Julius Augustus Fleischmann (June 8, 1871 – February 5, 1925) was an American businessman, the long-time president of Fleischmann's Yeast, and a former mayor of Cincinnati. The bon vivant, sailor, and sportsman was the youngest mayor by the year 1900 and later served three times as a delegate to the Republican National Convention.

Fleischmann's grandson, Julius Fleischmann, Jr. (1900–1968) was among other things a philanthropist who founded World Art, Inc. (directed by Serge Denham), an organization devoted to sponsoring cultural organizations. In 1937, World Art financed the Ballet Russe de Monte Carlo, which launched its first season in 1938.

Fleischmann's great-great-great-granddaughter Elizabeth Holmes is an American fraudster and former businesswoman who founded Theranos, a failed and fraudulent blood-testing Silicon Valley startup.

See also
Vienna bread

References

External links 
 Fleischmann's Yeast home page
 

1835 births
1897 deaths
People from Krnov
American food company founders
American people of Hungarian-Jewish descent
Ohio state senators
American racehorse owners and breeders
Burials at Spring Grove Cemetery
19th-century American politicians
19th-century American businesspeople
Hungarian emigrants to the United States
Businesspeople from Cincinnati